Toby Olson (born 1937 Chicago) is an American novelist and winner of the 1983 PEN/ Faulkner Award for Fiction.

Life
Through high school and his four years in the Navy as a surgical technician, he lived in California, Arizona, and Texas.

He graduated from Occidental College and Long Island University.

He co-founded and taught at the Aspen Writers' Workshop, and at Long Island University and The New School For Social Research, and since 1975 Temple University.

Recently, he has collaborated with composer Paul Epstein, including chamber music, songs, a short story set for voice and piano, and two chamber operas, Dorit, and Chihuahua. Both operas were performed by the Temple University Opera Theater.

He lives in Philadelphia and North Truro, on Cape Cod.

Awards
 1983 PEN/Faulkner Award, for Seaview
 1985 Guggenheim Fellowships
 2015 Henry Viscardi Achievement Awards
 Rockefeller Foundations
 National Endowment for the Arts

Works

Novels 
 
 
 
 
 
 Utah
 
 
 
 
 The Bitter Half.
 Tampico.

Poetry
 The Wrestlers & other poems.  Barlenmir House, 1984

References

External links

 "Toby Olson", Shearsman Books
Toby Olson letters to Carl Thayler collection held by Special Collections, University of Delaware Library

1937 births
Living people
20th-century American novelists
21st-century American novelists
American male novelists
Occidental College alumni
Long Island University alumni
Long Island University faculty
The New School faculty
20th-century American poets
21st-century American poets
American male poets
PEN/Faulkner Award for Fiction winners
20th-century American male writers
21st-century American male writers
Novelists from New York (state)
Novelists from Pennsylvania